Ludwik Ehrlich  (April 11, 1889 in Ternopil – October 31, 1968 in Kraków ) was a Polish lawyer, professor of Lviv University and the Jagiellonian, ad hoc judge of the Permanent Court of International Justice in The Hague.

References
Biogramy uczonych polskich [Biographies of Polish scientists, Part I: Social Science], vol. 1: A-J, Wrocław 1983

External links
Ehrlich, Ludwik at YIVO Encyclopedia
Ludwik article in Columbia Law Review at JSTOR

1889 births
1968 deaths
People from Ternopil
People from the Kingdom of Galicia and Lodomeria
Members of the Lwów Scientific Society
Academic staff of the University of Lviv
Academic staff of Jagiellonian University
University of California, Berkeley faculty
International Court of Justice judges
20th-century Polish judges
Burials at Rakowicki Cemetery
Recipients of the Order of the Banner of Work
Knights of the Order of Polonia Restituta